A zephyr is a stream-liner train-set of locomotives or power cars with matching passenger cars. Zephyr train-sets with proper names include:

Amtrak
Illinois Zephyr, Chicago, Illinois to Quincy, Illinois
California Zephyr, Chicago, Illinois to Emeryville, California
San Francisco Zephyr, Chicago, Illinois to San Francisco, California

Burlington-Rock Island Railroad
Rocky Mountain Rocket, Chicago, Illinois to Denver, Colorado
Sam Houston Zephyr, Fort Worth to Houston, Texas
Zephyr Rocket, St. Louis, Missouri to Minneapolis/St. Paul, Minnesota (jointly operated with Chicago, Burlington and Quincy Railroad)

Chicago, Burlington and Quincy Railroad
Ak-Sar-Ben Zephyr, Lincoln, Nebraska to Chicago, Illinois
American Royal Zephyr, Chicago to Kansas City
General Pershing Zephyr, Kansas City to St. Louis
Nebraska Zephyr, Chicago, Illinois to Lincoln, Nebraska
Ozark State Zephyr, Kansas City to St. Louis 
Pioneer Zephyr, a diesel-powered train set that ran on various routes
Silver Streak Zephyr, Lincoln, Nebraska to Kansas City, Missouri
Twin Cities Zephyr, Chicago to Minneapolis
Zephyr Rocket, St. Louis to Minneapolis; jointly operated with Rock Island Railroad

Other trains
Denver Zephyr, Denver to Chicago
Kansas City Zephyr, Kansas City to Chicago
Mark Twain Zephyr, St. Louis, Missouri to Burlington, Iowa; an early articulated trainset
Minnesota Zephyr, a heritage railroad out of Stillwater, Minnesota
Rio Grande Zephyr, Denver, Colorado to Ogden, Utah; operated by Denver and Rio Grande Western Railroad
Texas Zephyr, Denver to Dallas

Set index articles
Lists of named passenger trains